King Naresuan the Great (() or Sanphet II,; 1555/1556 – 25 April 1605) was the 18th monarch of Ayutthaya Kingdom and 2nd monarch of the Sukhothai dynasty. He was the king of the Ayutthaya Kingdom from 1590 and overlord of Lan Na from 1602 until his death in 1605. Naresuan is one of Thailand's most revered monarchs as he is known for his campaigns to free Ayutthaya from the vassalage of the Taungoo Empire. During his reign, numerous wars were fought against Taungoo Burma. Naresuan also welcomed the Dutch.

Early life
Prince Naret was born in Phitsanulok in 1555–56. He was the son of King Mahathammarachathirat of Phitsanulok and his queen consort, Wisutkasat. His mother was a daughter of Maha Chakkraphat and queen consort Suriyothai. His father was a Sukhothai noble who had defeated Worawongsathirat in 1548 and put Maha Chakkraphat on the throne. Prince Naret, also known as the "Black Prince", had a younger brother Ekathotsarot, known as the "White Prince", and an elder sister, Suphankanlaya.

During the siege of Ayutthaya during the Burmese–Siamese War (1563–64), King Bayinnaung of the Toungoo dynasty of Bago, Burma (formerly known in Burmese as Hanthawaddy ( and in Thai as  ) led a massive army, invading the country and laying siege to Phitsanulok. Maha Thammarachathirat came to believe that the city would not be able to withstand a long siege due to a scarcity of food and a smallpox outbreak, so he surrendered the city. King Bayinnaung took Phitsanulok and Ayutthaya, and made Thailand a Burmese tributary state. He required Maha Thammarachathirat to send his son—the Black Prince—to Bago as a royal hostage to ensure the king's fidelity.

At Bago
The Burmese–Siamese War (1568–69) was ended by Bayinnaung, who installed Maha Thammaracha as a vassal king of Ayutthaya. After six years in Pegu,  1570, Prince Naret and his brother the White Prince returned to Ayutthaya. While in Burma, "he followed the best of Burmese military training," studying alongside the "elite of Burmese youth, sons of princes and nobles."  "Besides being gifted in military prowess, Naresuan who was highly intelligent, gained a great deal of general knowledge of the times."

Viceroy

Maha Thammaracha made Naret the Uparaja ("crown prince") of Phitsanulok as Naresuan at the age of 15.

Naresuan joined his father and the King of Bago in an expedition to conquer Vientiane, the capital of the restored Lan Xang, but he contracted smallpox and had to return. He built Chankasem Palace in Ayutthaya as a residence when he visited his parents.

Cambodian attacks on Ayutthaya 
In 1570, after seeing the fall of Ayutthaya to the Burmese, Baraminreachea, the Khmer King, took an opportunity to retake the lands lost to the Siamese. He amassed an army of 20,000 men and captured Nakhon Nayok. He continued to march to Ayutthaya and set up camp at Ban Krathum sub-district. After setting up camp, he also planned to attack the city. The Cambodian navy of 50 ships soon arrived at Bangkok and besieged it. King Maha Thammarachathirat issued a command to defend Ayutthaya. The Cambodian besieged Ayutthaya for 3 days, but the city stood strong. The Cambodian army was forced to retreat back to Cambodia and took a large number of prisoners with them.

In 1574, when the Ayutthayan Army under the command of King Maha Thammarachathirat and King Naresuan was assisting Bayinnaung in his campaign to attack Lanxang, Baraminreachea took the opportunity to attack Ayutthaya again. Luckily, King Naresuan contracted smallpox and was forced to return to Ayutthaya to recover. When he got back to Ayutthaya, the Cambodian Navy was present and besieging Nai Kai fortress. The fortress fell to the Cambodian forces. King Naresuan lured the Cambodian navy up the river where they met the Siamese artillery. After heavy bombardment, the Cambodian navy was forced to retreat. 

In 1578, Phraya Chin Chantu, a Chinese noble serving under Cambodia attacked the city of Phetchaburi. The attack failed and Phraya Chin Chantu was too afraid to go back to Cambodia. He was allowed to take refuge in Ayutthaya by Maha Thammaracha. Shortly thereafter, he boarded a junk and fled. At that time, King Naresuan was 24 years old and was aware that Phraya Chin Chantu was a Cambodian agent who took refuge in Ayutthaya under false pretenses to gather information on the Siamese court. He ordered Siamese boats to chase Phraya Chin Chantu's junk. Since Chinese junks are much bigger than Siamese junks and were more suited for sailing out to sea, Phraya Chin Chantu was able to escape. 

In 1580, Baraminreachea still believed Siam was weak and ordered Thotsa Racha and Surin Racha to invade Siam with a force of 5,000 men. The force consisted with elephants and cavalry. The plan was to raid cities around Ayutthaya such as Saraburi and capture loot and people. Naresuan led a force of 3,000 men out of Ayutthaya to engage the Khmer army. The Khmer army was destroyed and forced to retreat back to Cambodia. This battle made King Naresuan revered among the Siamese and Burmese courts. As a result of this, the Khmers did not dare to attack Thailand again.

Wars with the Taungoo Dynasty 

In 1581, Bayinnaung died, and was succeeded by his son Nanda Bayin. Nanda's uncle Viceroy Thado Minsaw of Ava then rebelled in 1583, forcing Nanda Bayin to call upon the viceroys of Prome, Taungoo, Chiang Mai, Vientiane, and Ayutthaya for assistance in suppressing the rebellion. On 2 February 1584, Naresuan left with his troops to Bago as ordered, and arrived at the border only in April. According to Damrong, this raised Nanda's suspicions, who ordered his son, the Maha Uparaja Mingyi Swa, to remain in the capital and kill Naresuan. The Burmese chronicles say that Nanda made the decision to have Mingyi Swa guard Pegu prior to his march to Ava on 25 March 1584.

According to Damrong, Naresuan reached Kraeng the border town, where he learned that Phraya Ram and Phraya Kiet had been sent by the Maha Uparat to attack Naresuan from the rear while Maha Uparat attacked from the front. Naresuan called a council, which included priests, Phraya Kiat, Phraya Ram, and other Mons. Naresuan then "poured water on the earth from a gold goblet to proclaim to the devatas in the presence of the persons assembled, that from that day forth Siam had severed friendship with Hongsawadi and was no longer in amity as of yore."

According to Damrong, Naresuan then levied the Mons to join his campaign and marched onto Bago, intending to free the Siamese families held captive there. However, Nanda Bayin had already defeated the viceroy of Inwa and was returning to his capital. Naresuan then retreated after freeing about 10,000 families. Mingyi Swa pursued with Surakamma in the advance element. The Burmese caught up with the Siamese at the Satong River. There Surakamma was killed by "the royal gun used by Somdet Phra Naresuan while crossing the Satong river". This sent the Maha Uparat's troops into a panicked retreat, prompting him to return to the capital.

Naresuan then held the "ceremony of swearing allegiance" with the people of Sukhothai, drinking water from the sacred pond of Puay Si. His forces then took Sawankhalok. In 1584 Naresuan brought down all of the men from the northern provinces to the Siamese capital of Ayutthaya in preparation for the attack of the Bago army.

In the same year Nanda Bayin sent two separate armies, one under his uncle the viceroy of Pathein, and another from Chiang Mai under his younger brother Noratra Mangsosri.  Both were defeated in separate engagements before they could unite, and were driven back in retreat. Then in 1586, Naresuan defeated the Viceroy of Chiang Mai near Pa Mok and Bang Kaeo, capturing his encampment at Ban Saket with 10,000 soldiers, 120 elephants, 100 horses, 400 boats plus arms, ammunition, and provisions.

In October 1586, Nanda Bayin himself led the Burmese armies to Ayutthaya and begin the third invasion of Ayutthaya. Nanda Bayin armies laid siege to the city for five months, but failed to take the city due to an aggressive defense by Naresuan. He retreated.

In 1590, Maha Thammarachathirat died. In July 1590, Naresuan was crowned King of Ayutthaya as Sanphet II.

The Burmese army led by Phra Maha Uparat attacked Siam again, but Naresuan defeated it near Ban Khoi. The Burmese army retreated back to Bago, losing many men, elephants, horses, arms, and ammunition.

Reign as King of Ayutthaya

The elephant battle

King Naresuan is known in Thailand for his 1593 elephant duel with Crown Prince Mingyi Swa. However, most other accounts of the era mention an elephant battle but not a formal duel.

Ayutthaya chronicle narrative

In November 1592, Nanda Bayin ordered his son to attack Ayutthaya again. Mingyi Swa, Natshinnaung the son of the viceroy of Taungoo, and the viceroy of Prome formed three divisions. Mingyi Swa went through Three Pagodas Pass while the other two divisions came via Mae Lamao. The chief of Chiang Mai sent a boat force. Naresuan had been planning to attack Cambodia because of its border incursions, but then adjusted to the Burmese threat. Naresuan marched towards Suphan Buri and encamped his armies at Nong Sarai near the Thakhoi River. Naresuan formed a battle plan which involved a retreat, allowing the Burmese to follow, and then attack the disordered advance with his main army.

During the battle, in January 1593, the war elephants of Naresuan, Chaophraya Chaiyanuphap, and Ekathotsarot, Chaophraya Prap Traichak, were "in musth" and charged into the midst of the Burmese, with only a handful to Siamese being able to follow them in. According to Damrong's reconstruction, Naresuan, seeing Mingyi Swa on an elephant under a tree, shouted, "My brother, why do you stay on your elephant under the shade of a tree? Why not come out and engage in single combat to be an honour to us? There will be no kings in future who will engage in single combat like us."

The personal battle between Naresuan and Mingyi Swa was a highly romanticized historical scene known as the "Elephant Battle" ( .)

After a prolonged duel and narrowly missing Naresuan but cutting his helmet, Naresuan was able to cut Mingyi Swa with his ngao (glaive). Prince Somdet Phra Ekathotsarot was also able to kill the governor of Muang Chacharo. The main Siamese army then arrived and the Burmese were routed and scattered. The King of Bago then ordered the other two divisions to retreat.

Naresuan's ngao, Chao Phraya Prap Hongsawadi or "Chao Phraya which defeated Bago", and helmet, Chao Phraya Sen Phonlaphai or "Chao Phraya which defeated a hundred thousand soldiers", still exist today. Naresuan built a pagoda on the site of the elephant battle as a victory monument.

Naresuan brought before a council of judges those commanders he thought had disobeyed him or were negligent in their duties; they had been unable to follow him into the middle of the Burmese. The punishment was death. However, Somdet Phra Phanarat, a bhikkhu from Wat Yai Chai Mongkhon, calmed Naresuan enough to have the punishment rescinded. Instead, the guilty commanders were ordered to take Dawei and Tanintharyi for redemption.

Other accounts
The Burmese chronicles, however, do not mention a duel at all. According to Terwiel, there are ten different accounts of the battle by indigenous, European and Persian authors: (four Siamese, one Burmese, four late 16th and early 17th century European accounts and late 17th century one Persian account). Only one Siamese account says there was a formal elephant duel between Naresuan and Swa. However, Jeremias van Vliet's account of Siam in early 1630s includes interviews with Siamese subjects who were contemporaries of King Naresuan and who insisted that the elephant combat, which resulted in the death of the Burmese crown prince at the hands of Naresuan (whom the Siamese called "the black prince"), did indeed happen. According to Van Vliet's Description of the Siamese Kingdom:

In Terwiel's analysis of the other accounts, however, the Burmese crown prince and Naresuan both fought on their war elephant in the battle, although no formal duel probably ever took place. Per Terwiel, it is highly unlikely that Swa would have agreed to a formal duel since agreeing to do so would have "jeopardized the costly invasion that had thus far progressed without a hitch." During the battle, Naresuan's elephant got surrounded by the Burmese forces. During that crucial moment, a Burmese war elephant went musth, and attacked Swa's elephant. Seeing that Swa was in difficulty, Naresuan "closed in, and he (or one of the warriors riding with him, maybe a Portuguese) fired a gun which mortally wounded the crown prince" Swa. Naresuan was "lucky to escape from a very dangerous situation" but also quick to take advantage of it. According to Terwiel, the "Burmese and European accounts stayed closer to what actually may have happened", and "Naresuan's much repeated challenge to hold a duel, even though it looms large in many Thai history books, should be relegated to a legendary tale."

Dawei and Tanintharyi
In 1593, Naresuan sent Chao Phraya Chakri and Phraya Phra Khlang to attack Tanintharyi and Dawei, a Mon city, which fell after 15- and 20-day sieges respectfully.  Nanda Bayin launched a Burmese fleet to defend those cities, but arrived too late and was defeated by a combined Thai fleet. Additionally, a land force marching from Mottama was ambushed by the combined Chakri and Khlang force, resulting in the capture of 11 Burmese commanders, many elephants, horses, men, arms, and ammunition.

Capture of Longvek

In 1593, Naresuan then launched a successful campaign to subjugate Cambodia. He was said to have executed its king Nakphra Sattha, but this account is unlikely to be true since there are no evidences that support this claim, and base on historical accounts in Cambodia as well as from Spanish and Portuguese explorers, Nakphra Sattha was said to have escaped to Vientiane where he remained until he died. 

Naresuan then brought Khmer families to populate his northern provinces.

Capture of Mottama
As Burmese control over the tributaries had weakened, the Mons took this opportunity to free themselves. The Mon governor of Mawlamyine rebelled against Bago and requested Siamese support. Naresuan sent troops to help and the Burmese abandoned their garrison at Martaban. Nanda Bayin then sent the viceroy of Taungoo to suppress the uprising, but his force was defeated. The Mon provinces then became subject to the Siamese Kingdom.

Invasion of Bago

Naresuan then decided to attack Bago in 1595. He laid siege on the city for three months before retreating when the viceroys of Prome, Taungoo, and Ava sent relief forces. Naresuan did take back many prisoners of war, lessening the fighting strength of the Burmese.

The Lord of Prome staged a rebellion against Nanda Bayin in 1595, followed by Taungoo, Rakhine, Lan Na, and Lan Xang. King Nokeo Koumane of Lan Xang prepared to march through Lan Na to Bago to rescue the people of Lan Xang held captive. The Viceroy of Lan Na Chiang Mai then submitted his territory to Siamese control and Naresuan sent Siamese forces to prevent Laotian forces from entering Lan Na.

After these series of upheavals in the Burmese Empire, Naresuan decided to attack Bago again in 1599, using Arakan and Taungoo as allies. However, before Naresuan arrived at the city, the forces of Arakan and Taungoo had already invested the city. The Viceroy of Taungoo ended up taking the populace back to Taungoo, abandoning the city to the forces of Arakan to loot what property was left behind, and then setting flames to the palace and monasteries.

Invasion of Taungoo and Lan Na
Naresuan occupied Bago while Minye Thihathu II, Viceroy of Taungoo, had already taken Nanda Bayin to Taungoo. Naresuan requested Minye Thihathu send Nanda Bayin back to him but Minye Thihathu refused, stating he was unwell. After that Naresuan laid siege to Taungoo for two months but retreated due to lack of food.

Death

Natshinnaung killed Nanda Bayin while he was held captive in Toungoo.  Nyaungyan Min then crowned himself as the King of Ava to counter the Viceroys of Toungoo and Prome. Siam was then free of a Burmese threat for four years until the King of Ava went on a campaign to subjugate the Shans. When he advanced as far as Theinni, Naresuan raised an army of 200,000 men to counter the threat to his kingdom. He advanced as far as the Fang District of Chiang Mai Province before falling ill and then died after three days on 25 April 1605. His brother King Ekathotsarot became his successor as king.

Recent studies of Burmese records by historians of Silpakorn University showed that he returned to Wiang Haeng, where he died of disease, probably smallpox.

Many Shan believe King Naresuan was cremated and his ashes interred in a stupa in Mongton, in the Daen Lao Range, in the southern part of the Shan State.

Ancestry

Legacy

According to Damrong Rajanubhab, "Naresuan was recorded as a brave and glorious king.  Therefore his glory is evident up to the present day.  The kingdom of Siam at that period was widest in extent, opulent and redounding in glory."

Thai baht banknotes
100 baht note of series 12, issued with the intention of glorifying Thai monarchs in history who have been revered and honored with the title The Great.
50 baht note of series 16, issued to glorify Thai kings of different periods from past to present.

 Royal Thai Armed Forces Day, 18 January, commemorates his victory in the 1593 elephant duel.
 , Royal Thai Navy frigate.
 Naresuan University in Phitsanulok is named after the king and features a large statue of the king.
 One of the two largest dams in Phitsanulok Province is named the Naresuan Dam. It controls water flow of the Nan River north of the city of Phitsanulok.
 Thung Yai Naresuan Wildlife Sanctuary is the nation's largest conservation site.
 Following the 2014 Thai coup d'état, a free showing of a King Naresuan film was credited with making viewers feel happy.

In Media

 King Naresuan — a 2007 film series based on the king's life
 Khan Kluay — a 2006 animated Thai film based on the life of the king's war elephant, followed by the lives of the elephant's offspring in Khan Kluay 2.
 King Naresuan Online — a fantasy massively multiplayer online role-playing game (MMORPG) released in 2010 by KNO - King Naresuan Online
 Civilization V — PC game released in 2010 in which Siam has a unique unit named "Naresuan's Elephant" in honor of the king's elephant armies
 The Legend of King Naresuan: The Series — a television series in 2017

Notes

References

Further reading
 เว็บไซต์ทุกเรื่องราวของสมเด็จพระนเรศวรมหาราช

 
 

 

 
 

1550s births
1605 deaths
Sukhothai dynasty
Kings of Ayutthaya
16th-century monarchs in Asia
17th-century monarchs in Asia
Princes of Ayutthaya
People from Phitsanulok province
16th-century Thai people
17th-century Thai people